Kirkby Thore is a small village and civil parish in Cumbria, England, in the historic county of Westmorland. It is close to the Lake District national park and the Cumbrian Pennines. It includes the areas of Bridge End, in the southwest by the A66, and Cross End in the northeast of the village. In the 2001 census, the parish had a population of 731, increasing to 758 in the 2011 Census.

History
The place-name 'Kirkby Thore' is first attested in 1179 in the 'Register of Holm Cultram', where it appears as Kirkebythore. Kirkby means 'church village' or 'village with a church', whilst Thore is an Old Norse personal name related to the god Thor.

The village is on the site of a Roman cavalry camp called Bravoniacum or Brovonacae and Roman coins, tombstones, sandals, urns, earthen vessels, and the cusp of a spear have been found in the locality. Since  the  time  of  Septimius  Severus's campaigns  between  208  and  211 CE,  a  division of Numidian auxiliary light cavalry garrisoned the fort of Bravoniacum, constituting the first African community in Britain. The Maiden Way Roman road led north from Bravoniacum to the fort of Epiacum (Whitley Castle) near Alston, and thence to Magnae (Carvoran) on Hadrian's Wall, where it joined the Stanegate road running from west to east. It was reported in 2016 that LIDAR technology has revealed another Roman road running southwest from Kirkby Thore to the Roman fort at Low Borrowbridge near Tebay.

The Anglican church of St Michael in Kirkby Thore is built of red sandstone and dates from Norman times. The village also had a Methodist chapel.

The village is also home to Kirkby Thore Hall, a Grade II* medieval Manor House of particular structural interest.

Gypsum has been quarried or mined in the area for over 200 years. The local British Gypsum Ltd plant has produced plaster since 1910 and plasterboard since the 1960s. Currently it is more economic to use desulpho-gypsum transported by rail from Drax Power Station than to mine it locally but this depends on Drax continuing. British Gypsum has a private siding on the Settle-Carlisle Railway which passes to the north of the village.

There are a number of farms in the village and surrounding area.  Some are large dairy farms, others beef and/or sheep with some arable crops.

Governance
Kirkby Thore is in the parliamentary constituency of Penrith and the Border. Neil Hudson was elected its Conservative Member of Parliament at the 2019 General Election, replacing Rory Stewart.

Before Brexit, it was in the North West England European Parliamentary Constituency.

In the past the village has either been part of the constituency of Appleby or the constituency of Westmorland. An Appleby electoral ward of the same name exists. This ward stretches west to Mallerstang with a total population of 1,563.

Transport and facilities
The busy A66 road runs through the western edge of the village. This will be one of the last sections of the A66 to be upgraded to dual carriageway; in 2006 the Highways Agency conducted public consultation on the route for a bypass (which will connect the existing Appleby bypass to the east and the Temple Sowerby bypass (opened in part October 2007, ahead of schedule) to the west. The public consultation fell by the wayside and dualling of the A66 at Kirkby Thore is still an aspiration.

The village contains a village shop with post office,  a filling station (and shop) and a bistro serving meals.

Notable people
Siblings Helen Skelton and Gavin Skelton grew up in a farm near the village and attended Kirkby Thore Primary School before transferring to Appleby Grammar School. Helen is now a television presenter, best known for working on Blue Peter and Countryfile, whilst Gavin is a professional footballer who has played in the Scottish Premier League with Gretna, Kilmarnock and Hamilton Academicals. During 2016 he was player-manager of Queen of the South in Dumfries. He was appointed assistant manager of Carlisle United in June 2019.

See also

 Listed buildings in Kirkby Thore
 Kirkby Thore railway station

References

External links

 Highways Agency page on the possible Kirkby Thore bypasses.
Cumbria County History Trust: Kirkby Thore (nb: provisional research only - see Talk page)

Villages in Cumbria
Westmorland
Gypsum mines in England
Civil parishes in Cumbria
Roman sites in Cumbria
Eden District